The 2018 Sugar Bowl was a College Football Playoff semifinal bowl game that was played on January 1, 2018 at the Mercedes-Benz Superdome in New Orleans. The 84th Sugar Bowl game, it matched two of the top four teams selected by the Selection Committee-Alabama from the SEC and Clemson from the ACC to compete to face the winner of the Rose Bowl (Georgia) in the 2018 College Football Playoff National Championship played on January 8, 2018, at Mercedes-Benz Stadium in Atlanta, Georgia. It was one of the 2017–18 bowl games that concluded the 2017 FBS football season.  Sponsored by the Allstate insurance company, the game is officially known as the Allstate Sugar Bowl.

The contest was televised on ESPN and ESPN Deportes, with a radio broadcast on ESPN Radio and XM Satellite Radio, with kickoff at 8:00 PM CT (9:00 PM ET).

Teams 
The #1-ranked Clemson Tigers, champions of the Atlantic Coast Conference, faced the #4-ranked Alabama Crimson Tide, co-champions of the SEC West Division (along with Auburn who won head-to-head over Alabama.) This was the third consecutive year in which Clemson and Alabama met in the CFPs, though the previous two meetings were in the CFP Championship Game.

See also 
 Alabama–Clemson football rivalry

Notes 
 January 1, 2018 – The Rose Bowl in Pasadena hosted the other semi-final game.

This was Alabama's first Sugar Bowl win of the Nick Saban era. This was also their first win in a Sugar bowl since 1993 against Miami. The Tide had lost games in the 2008–2009, 2013–2014, and 2014–2015 football/bowl seasons. This was also the first win for the Southeastern Conference in the Sugar Bowl since 2010 (Ole Miss has to vacate a win over Oklahoma State), including losses to Louisville, Oklahoma (twice) and Ohio State (twice).

Game summary
The Crimson Tide immediately took a 10–3 lead at halftime. Alex Spence was the only player to score for the Clemson Tigers with just two field goals. Alabama's defense was a huge factor in the game holding the Tigers to only six points. This matchup was a rematch of the 2017 College Football Playoff National Championship in which the Tigers won with quarterback Deshaun Watson leading the team as the game's MVP. The Tigers were not able to perform without Watson and with Kelly Bryant.

Scoring summary

Statistics

References 

2017–18 NCAA football bowl games
2017–18 College Football Playoff
Sugar Bowl
Alabama Crimson Tide football bowl games
Clemson Tigers football bowl games
Sugar Bowl
21st century in New Orleans
Sugar Bowl